Half a Sixpence is an album pianist and bandleader Count Basie and His Orchestra featuring performances of music from the motion picture Half a Sixpence recorded in 1967 and released on the Dot label.

Track listing
All compositions by David Heneker except as indicated
 "Half a Sixpence" - 2:27
 "A Proper Gentleman" - 2:09
 "She's Too Far Above Me" - 3:01
 "I Know What I Am" - 2:06
 "This Is My World" (Heneker, Irwin Kostal) - 2:24
 "All in the Cause of Economy" - 2:59
 "If the Rain's Got to Fall" - 2:45
 "I Don't Believe a Word Of It" - 2:30
 "Flash, Bang, Wallop!" - 1:59
 "The Race Is On" - 2:07
 "I'm Not Talking to You" - 2:32
 "Money to Burn" - 2:10
Recorded in New York City on November 9, 1967 (tracks 3, 5, 6 & 11) and November 10, 1967 (tracks 1, 2, 4, 7-10 & 12)

Personnel 
Count Basie - piano
Gene Goe, Sam Noto (track 3, 5, 6 & 11), Victor Paz, Ernie Royal (tracks 1, 2, 4, 7-10 & 12) - trumpet 
Al Aarons - trumpet, flugelhorn
Richard Boone, Harlan Floyd, Grover Mitchell - trombone
Bill Hughes - bass trombone
Bobby Plater, Marshal Royal - alto saxophone 
Eric Dixon, Illinois Jacquet - tenor saxophone
Charlie Fowlkes - baritone saxophone
Freddie Green - guitar
Norman Keenan  - bass
Ed Shaughnessy - drums
Chico O'Farrill - arranger

References 

1968 albums
Count Basie Orchestra albums
Dot Records albums
Albums produced by Teddy Reig
Albums arranged by Chico O'Farrill